The 6th Annual Indonesian Movie Awards was held on May 30, 2012, at the Tennis Indoor Senayan, Central Jakarta. The award show was hosted by Winky Wiryawan and Prisia Nasution. And the nominations have been announced for the category of Favorite, which will be chosen by the public via SMS. As for the category of Best, will be selected by a jury that has been appointed. As a guest star who will fill the event, among them Koil, Bondan Prakoso & Fade 2 Black, Yovie & Nuno, Coboy Junior, Penta Boyz, Latinka, etc.

Arisan! 2 leads the nominations with twelve nominations, with Sang Penari and Dilema followed behind with ten and eight nominations each. Contrast with the celebration of Indonesian Movie Awards last year, this year only a handful of films that success to more than four nominations each, while another film only success to bring two or three nominations each.

Sang Penari and Dilema was biggest winner in this ceremonies of taking home three trophies for each film. Other film, Arisan! 2, Lovely Man, and Tendangan dari Langit took home two trophies each, while the other film taking home one trophy each.

Nominees and winners

Best
Winners are listed first and highlighted in boldface.

Favorite
Winners are listed first and highlighted in boldface.

Film with most nominations and awards

Most nominations

The following film received most nominations:

Most wins
The following film received most nominations:

References

External links
 * Situs web resmi IMA 2012

Indonesian
2012 in Indonesia
May 2012 events in Indonesia
Indonesian Movie Actor Awards